August (2001), is the first novel by author Gerard Woodward. It was shortlisted for Whitbread Book Award (2001).

Plot introduction 
Set from the mid-1950s till 1971, the book tells the story of the Jones family, who leave their home in London for a camping holiday in Wales every August.

2001 novels
Novels about cycling
Novels set in Wales
Family saga novels
Novels set in the 1950s
Novels set in the 1960s
2001 debut novels
Chatto & Windus books